Obukhov (masculine) or Obukhova (feminine) is a Russian surname. Variants of this surname include Abukhov/Abukhova (/), Abukhovich, Obukh, Obukhovich, and Obukhovsky/Obukhovskaya (/).

They derive from the nickname "" (Obukh), or "" (Abukh) in dialects with akanye. While the primary meaning of the Russian word "" is the dull side of a sharp tool opposite of the cutting side, in some dialects it also has the figurative meaning of dumb, stupid, or stubborn person; one who disobeys.

The following people share this surname:
Alexander Obukhov (1918–1989), Russian physicist
Alexander Obukhov, Russian chess grandmaster
Alexey Obukhov (b. 1928), Russian diplomat
Boris Obukhov (1891–1937), Soviet naval officer, a victim of Stalin's purges
Boris Petrovich Obukhov, governor of Pskov Governorate, Russia in 1867–1868
Dmitri Obukhov, Russian ice hockey player
Dmitry Obukhov, third-place winner of the Third Open Mathematical Olympiad of the Belarusian-Russian University
Igor Obukhov (b. 1996), Russian association football player
Mikhail Obukhov, 1907 interpreter of Zephyr in the ballet The Seasons
Nadezhda Obukhova (1886–1961), Russian mezzo-soprano
Nikolai Obukhov (1892–1954), Russian composer
Oleksiy Obukhov, Ukrainian bronze medalist in 1997 World Weightlifting Championships – Men's 99 kg
Platon Obukhov (b. 1968), Russian journalist, writer, translator, and painter
Pyotr Obukhov, leader of the construction crew which Karl Blank, Russian architect, joined
Sergey Obukhov (b. 1974), Russian bandy player
Viktor Obukhov (1898–1975), Soviet general
Vladimir Obukhov (b. 1992), Russian association football player
Yelena Obukhova, bronze medalist in women's high jump at the 1986 World Junior Championships in Athletics
Yevgeny Obukhov (1921-1944), Hero of the Soviet Union
Yevgeniya Obukhova, Miss Russia 2007 contestant

References

Notes

Sources
И. М. Ганжина (I. M. Ganzhina). "Словарь современных русских фамилий" (Dictionary of Modern Russian Last Names). Москва, 2001. 

Russian-language surnames